Smart Voting is a tactical voting strategy put forward by the team of Alexei Navalny with the aim of depriving the ruling United Russia party of votes in regional and federal elections. The goal of Smart Voting is to consolidate the votes of those who oppose the party which Navalny dubbed as the "party of crooks and thieves".

History 
On 28 November 2018, Alexei Navalny launched the Smart Voting project. Initially, the system was mainly aimed at depriving the nominees from the politically dominant United Russia party of their victory in the elections to the post of Governor of St. Petersburg and the Moscow City Duma on 8 September 2019. Navalny explained the strategy as follows (translated from Russian): "The parties themselves cannot agree and nominate a single candidate against United Russia. But we can agree on this. We are different, but we have one policy — we are against the monopoly of United Russia. Everything else is mathematics. If we all act smartly and vote for the strongest candidate, he will win, and United Russia will lose."

Reception 
According to a research paper by political analysts Ivan Bolshakov and Vladimir Perevalov, Navalny’s Smart Voting strategy, on average, improved the results of opposition candidates by 5.6% in the September 2019 Moscow City Duma election. While Smart Voting played a decisive role in the victory of several candidates, it took away votes from approximately the same number of opposition representatives.

According to political scientist Abbas Gallyamov, the percentage of votes for United Russia in the Russian Public Opinion Research Center's forecast for the 2021 Russian legislative election is significantly overestimated and the percentage of votes for the Communist Party of the Russian Federation is significantly underestimated. For Gallyamov, no more than 26–27% of those who stand at the polls would vote for United Russia, and Smart Voting is a tool that could deliver a significant blow to the ruling party, which in his view explains why the authorities attacked it.

Censorship 
In September 2021, two weeks before the State Duma election, Moscow Arbitration Tribunal issued an injunction prohibiting Google and Yandex from creating a list of results for the search query Smart Voting. The lawsuit against both companies was brought by Woolintertrade, a company whose main activity is the wholesale of agricultural raw materials. Earlier in the summer, the company received approval from Rospatent, the Russian governmental agency in charge of intellectural property, to register the Smart Voting trademark and then sued for trademark protection. The court then approved the block as an interim measure.

At the same time, Roskomnadzor, the Russian federal executive agency responsible for monitoring, controlling and censoring Russian mass media, restricted access to the Smart Voting website insisting that the website was used to continue the activities of the "extremist" organization Anti-Corruption Foundation. Roskomnadzor also warned Apple and Google that they were risking fines by not removing the Smart Voting app from their app stores; the warning said that not blocking the app could be interpreted as "interference in Russian election". On 17 September, Apple and Google complied with Roskomnadzors demands and removed the app from their app stores. Later that day, Telegram messenger blocked a Smart Voting chat bot. On September 15, regulators temporarily blocked Google Docs where the list of Smart Voting endorsements had been released. Navalny's team subsequently published the list to GitHub. Google Docs and YouTube removed the Smart Voting lists following a Roskomnadzor demand on September 18.

References 

Alexei Navalny
Elections in Russia
Voting theory